KVPT (channel 18) is a PBS member television station in Fresno, California, United States, owned by Valley Public Television, Inc. Its studios are located on Van Ness Avenue and Calaveras Street in downtown Fresno, and its transmitter is located on Bear Mountain, near Meadow Lakes, California.

K18HD-D (channel 18) in Bakersfield operates as a low-power translator of KVPT.

History
The station first signed on the air on April 10, 1977 as KMTF; it was founded by the Fresno County Public Schools district. Prior to the station's sign-on, PBS distributed select programs to the area's commercial television stations on a per-program basis; the only PBS station available in the market before channel 18 signed on was KVIE in Sacramento, which was carried on local cable providers.

In 1987, Fresno County Public Schools sold the station to the community-owned Valley Public Television, Inc. In 1990, the station launched a low-power translator station in Bakersfield on UHF channel 65, making Bakersfield one of the last markets in the country to add over-the-air public television service. That year, channel 18 changed its call letters to KVPT (the KMTF call letters would later be used by a television station in Helena, Montana from 1998 to 2015). In March 2007, KVPT purchased Multimedios Television affiliate K18HD-D from Mintz Broadcasting (owned by businessman Michael Mintz), which became the station's new Bakersfield translator.

For many years, the station was branded on-air as "Valley Public Television". On September 27, 2010, KVPT altered its branding to "Valley PBS", however the "Valley Public Television" name remains in use by its ownership group. With Los Angeles station KCET ending its PBS membership in January 2011 (incidentally, KCET operates a translator in Bakersfield), KVPT became the only PBS station located between Merced and Bakersfield. (KCET would rejoin PBS as a secondary member in 2019, following a merger with KOCE-TV.)

Beginning January 16, KVPT started airing the PBS Kids channel on digital channel 18.2. The PBS Kids channel is carried on cable in Fresno and Bakersfield. To allow for the new channel, Create has moved to digital channel 18.3. The station is not available on satellite providers in Bakersfield because the national feed of PBS is carried instead. As of 2020, ValleyPBS received a new logo to match with PBS overhaul branding.

Technical information

Subchannels
The station's digital signal is multiplexed:

Translator

Analog-to-digital conversion
KVPT signed on its digital signal on April 25, 2008. The station shut down its analog signal, over UHF channel 18, on February 17, 2009, the original target date in which full-power television stations in the United States were to transition from analog to digital broadcasts under federal mandate. The station's digital signal remained on its pre-transition UHF channel 40. Through the use of PSIP, digital television receivers display the station's virtual channel as its former UHF analog channel 18.

Spectrum auction repack
KVPT is one of nearly 1,000 television stations in the United States that had to change its digital channel allocation in the 2018 spectrum auction repack. KVPT moved to UHF channel 32 from UHF channel 40 on October 15, 2018 at 8 a.m. local in phase one of the repack.

References

External links
Official website

PBS member stations
VPT
Mass media in Fresno County, California
Mass media in Bakersfield, California
Mass media in Kern County, California
Mass media in Tulare County, California
Television channels and stations established in 1977
1977 establishments in California